Supol Phuasirirak (nickname Bell, born 15 December 1981) is Thai singer and television host. He studied at Assumption College and Assumption University.

He has released several records with GMM Grammy, and is best known for the hit songs "Mai Thammada" and "Saen Lan Nathi".

Studio albums 
 Happy Hours (2012)
 Good Afternoon (2010)
 Very Bell (2009)
 Sleepless Society 3 By Narongvit One Night Stand (2008)
 D.I.Y by Narongvit
 Left & Right The Celebration Album (2007)
 Gift (2006)

References 

Supol Phuasirirak
GMM Grammy artists
Supol Phuasirirak
Living people
1981 births